The Standing Committee on Justice is a standing committee of the Parliament of Norway. It is responsible for policies relating to judicial system, the probation service, the police, persons performing civilian national service, other judicial issues, ex gratia payments, general legislation relating to public administration, the penal code, civil and criminal procedural legislation and general civil legislation.. It corresponds to the Ministry of Justice. The committee has 12 members and is chaired by Hadia Tajik of the Labour Party.

Members 2013–17

References

Standing committees of the Storting
Parliamentary committees on Justice